Yumbel Trilahue Airport is a public airport  east-southeast of the town of Yumbel in the Bío Bío Region of Chile.

See also

Transport in Chile
List of airports in Chile

References

External links
OpenStreetMap - Yumbel Trilahue
OurAirports - Yumbel Trilahue
FallingRain - Yumbel Trilahue Airport

Airports in Chile
Airports in Biobío Region